Johnny Graham (5 May 1875 – 16 August 1946) was an Australian rules footballer who played with Essendon in both the Victorian Football League (VFL).

Family
The son of George Graham (1837-1897), and Sarah Graham (1833-1898), née McPhail, John Alexander Graham was born at Geelong on 5 May 1875.

He married Alice Eliza Lemmon at Carlton, Victoria on 22 February 1899. They were divorced in 1932.

He married Elsie Jane Morrow (1891-1962) in 1933.

Football

Essendon (VFA)
He played for Essendon in the VFA in 1896.

Essendon (VFL)
Playing at full-forward in his only VFL senior match — in which he kicked two goals — he was one of the 20 who played for Essendon in its first VFL match against Geelong, at Corio Oval, on 8 May 1897:  Jim Anderson, Edward "Son" Barry, Arthur Cleghorn, Tod Collins, Jim Darcy, Charlie Forbes, Johnny Graham, Joe Groves, George Hastings, Ted Kinnear, George Martin, Bob McCormick, Pat O'Loughlin, Gus Officer, Ned Officer, Bert Salkeld, George Stuckey, George Vautin, Norman Waugh, and Harry Wright.

Death
He died at his residence in Boronia, Victoria on 16 August 1946.

Notes

References
 
 Maplestone, M., Flying Higher: History of the Essendon Football Club 1872–1996, Essendon Football Club, (Melbourne), 1996.

External links 

1875 births
1946 deaths
Australian rules footballers from Victoria (Australia)
Essendon Football Club (VFA) players
Essendon Football Club players